Lloyd Horton Carins  (29 June 1923 – 16 July 2007) was an Australian politician in Tasmania.

He was born in Tasmania. In 1962 he was elected to the Tasmanian Legislative Council as the independent member for South Esk. He was Chair of Committees from 1979 to 1980, in which year he retired. Carins died on 16 July 2007, aged 84.

References

1923 births
2007 deaths
Independent members of the Parliament of Tasmania
Members of the Tasmanian Legislative Council
Officers of the Order of the British Empire
20th-century Australian politicians